The Secret of Mayerling (French: Le secret de Mayerling) is a 1949 French  Historical drama film directed by Jean Delannoy and starring Jean Marais, Dominique Blanchar and Jean Debucourt. It set around the 1889 Mayerling Incident when the crown prince of the Austrian Empire was found having apparently committed suicide with his lover.

It was shot at the Epinay Studios with sets designed by the art director Raymond Druart.

It was a commercial success in France and other European countries, including in West Germany where it was released by Constantin Film.

Cast
Jean Marais as Rudolf, Crown Prince of Austria
Dominique Blanchar as Baroness Mary Vetsera
Jean Debucourt as Emperor Franz Joseph I of Austria
Claude Farell as Countess Larisch
Silvia Monfort as Archduchess Stéphanie
Jane Marken as Baroness Vetsera
Marguerite Jamois as Empress Elisabeth of Austria
Denise Benoît as Anna Vetsera
Madeleine Foujane as the German ambassador
Michel Vitold as Archduke Jean-Salvator
Jacques Dacqmine as Archduke François-Ferdinand 
Jean Toulout as Count Taafe
Raphaël Patorni as Count Hoyos
François Richard as Prince of Saxe-Cobourg
André Carnège as doctor
Charles Lemontier as Loschek
Jean Aymé as Nuncio
Andrews Engelmann as the Killer

References

External links

French historical drama films
1949 drama films
1940s historical drama films
Films directed by Jean Delannoy
Rudolf, Crown Prince of Austria
Films set in Vienna
Films set in 1889
Biographical films about Austrian royalty
Cultural depictions of Empress Elisabeth of Austria
Cultural depictions of Franz Joseph I of Austria
Films shot at Epinay Studios
French black-and-white films
1940s French-language films
1940s French films